Panther Branch is a stream in Iron County in the U.S. state of Missouri. It is a tributary of Ottery Creek.

Panther Branch was so named on account of panthers in the area.

See also
List of rivers of Missouri

References

Rivers of Iron County, Missouri
Rivers of Missouri